Eucidaris thouarsii, the slate pencil urchin, is a species of cidaroid sea urchins that inhabits littoral regions of the East Pacific Ocean.

Distribution and habitat

The Galápagos, Clipperton and Cocos populations are now often recognized as a separate species, E. galapagensis, instead of a subspecies of E. thouarsii.

Diet 
Like all urchins these are primarily herbivores, but feed on a wide range of invertebrates. This species has a high nutrient absorption efficiency when it comes to the coral Pocillopora damicornis, but would require a large intake to make nutrient requirements. Due to its high intake of coral, it reduces reef growth.

References

External links
 
 
 

Animals described in 1846
thouarsii